Schöneck may refer to:

Schöneck, Hesse, town in Germany
Schöneck, Saxony, town in Germany
Schœneck, municipality in Lorraine, France
Skarszewy (former German: Schöneck), Poland
Schönig or Schöneck, German Renaissance printing family

See also
Schoeneck (disambiguation)